Froesiochloa is a genus of South American plants in the grass family. The only known species is Froesiochloa boutelouoides, native to Guyana, French Guiana, and Brazil (Amapá, Pará).

The genus Froesiochloa is in the family Poaceae in the major group Angiosperms (Flowering plants).[8]

References

Bambusoideae
Bambusoideae genera
Grasses of South America
Monotypic Poaceae genera